Charles Edward Harris was a state legislator in Massachusetts in 1892 and 1893.
He was born in Boston. He served on the Common Council. He lived at No. 24 Phillips Street. He was a Republican.

References

19th-century American politicians

Massachusetts Republicans

Year of birth missing
Year of death missing